The first world record in the men's 400 metres freestyle in long course (50 metres) swimming was recognised by the International Swimming Federation (FINA) in 1908. In the short course (25 metres) swimming events the world's governing body recognizes world records since 3 March 1991.

Men

Long course

Murray Rose's 4:25.9 set in a 25-metre pool on 12 Jan 1957 was only valid until 1 May the same year. Due to the new rule that records must be set in a 50-metre pool, and the fact that neither John Marshall's 4:26.9 from 1951, nor Ford Konno's 4:26.7 from 1954 were set in 50-metre pools, the WR reverted to Rose's 4:27.0 from 1956.

Short course

Women

Long course

Short course

All-time top 25

Men long course
Correct as of June 2022

Notes
Below is a list of other times equal or superior to 3:43.75:
Ian Thorpe also swam 3:40.17 (2001), 3:40.54 (2002), 3:40.59 (2000), 3:40.76 (2001), 3:41.33 (2000), 3:41.71 (2001), 3:41.83 (1999), 3:42.41 (2003), 3:42.58 (2003), 3:43.10 (2004).
Sun Yang also swam 3:40.29 (2011), 3:41.38 (2017), 3:41.48 (2011), 3:41.59 (2013), 3:41.68 (2016), 3:41.94 (2017), 3:42.16 (2017), 3:42.31 (2012), 3:42.44 (2019), 3:42.47 (2010), 3:42.49 (2012), 3:42.58 (2015), 3:42.70 (2015), 3:42.75 (2019), 3:42.89 (2012), 3:42.92 (2018), 3:42.93 (2013), 3:43.23 (2014), 3:43.24 (2011), 3:43.55 (2016), 3:43.65 (2014), 3:43.68 (2013), 3:43.73 (2019).
Mack Horton also swam 3:41.65 (2016), 3:42.84 (2015), 3:43.17 (2019).
Park Tae-hwan also swam 3:41.86 (2008), 3:42.04 (2011), 3:42.06 (2012), 3:43.15 (2014), 3:43.35 (2008), 3:43.59 (2008), 3:43.68 (2016).
Zhang Lin also swam 3:42.44 (2008), 3:42.63 (2009), 3:43.32 (2008), 3:43.58 (2009).
Lukas Märtens also swam 3:42.50 (2022), 3:42.85 (2022).
Elijah Winnington also swam 3:42.65 (2021), 3:43.06 (2022), 3:43.10 (2022).
Oussama Mellouli also swam 3:42.71 (2009), 3:43.45 (2008).
Grant Hackett also swam 3:42.91 (2005), 3:42.94 (2003), 3:43.15 (2008), 3:43.35 (2004), 3:43.36 (2004), 3:43.48 (2002).
Paul Biedermann also swam 3:43.01 (2009).
Larsen Jensen also swam 3:43.10 (2008), 3:43.53 (2008).
Peter Vanderkaay also swam 3:43.20 (2009), 3:43.73 (2008).
Gabriele Detti also swam 3:43.36 (2017, 2019), 3:43.49 (2016), 3:43.73 (2020).
Danas Rapsys also swam 3:43.50 (2019).
Jack McLoughlin also swam 3:43.52 (2021).
David McKeon also swam 3:43.72 (2014).

Men short course
Correct as of December 2022

Notes
Below is a list of other times equal or superior to 3:36.87:
Danas Rapšys also swam 3:34.01 (2018), 3:35.49 (2020), 3:36.23 (2021), 3:36.26 (2022).
Paul Biedermann also swam 3:34.55 (2009), 3:35.96 (2015).
Grant Hackett also swam 3:35.01 (1999), 3:36.17 (2002).
Péter Bernek also swam 3:35.46 (2015).
Aleksandr Krasnykh also swam 3:35.51 (2017), 3:36.83 (2017), 3:36.84 (2018).
Ian Thorpe also swam 3:35.64 (1999), 3:35.75 (2000).
Kieran Smith also swam 3:35.99 (2022).
Park Tae-hwan also swam 3:36.68 (2007).

Women long course
Correct as of March 2023

Notes
Below is a list of other times equal or superior to 4:03.21:
Ariarne Titmus also swam 3:56.69 (2021), 3:56.90 (2021), 3:58.06 (2022), 3:58.76 (2019), 3:59.35 (2019), 3:59.66 (2018, 2019), 4:00.03 (2022), 4:00.93 (2018), 4:01.34 (2021), 4:01.66 (2021), 4:01.73 (2018), 4:01.94 (2023), 4:02.36 (2018), 4:02.42 (2019), 4:02.86 (2017).
Katie Ledecky also swam 3:57.36 (2021), 3:57.94 (2018), 3:58.15 (2022), 3:58.34 (2017), 3:58.37 (2014), 3:58.44 (2017), 3:58.50 (2018), 3:58.71 (2016), 3:58.86 (2014), 3:58.98 (2016), 3:59.06 (2017), 3:59.09 (2018), 3:59.13 (2015), 3:59.25 (2021), 3:59.28 (2019), 3:59.52 (2022), 3:59.54 (2016), 3:59.66 (2020), 3:59.71 (2022), 3:59.79 (2022), 3:59.82 (2013), 3:59.89 (2014), 3:59.95 (2019), 3:59.97 (2019), 4:00.20 (2023), 4:00.31 (2016), 4:00.35 (2018), 4:00.37 (2021), 4:00.38 (2022), 4:00.45 (2021), 4:00.47 (2015), 4:00.51 (2018, 2021), 4:00.81 (2019), 4:00.95 (2022), 4:00.98 (2017), 4:01.01 (2017), 4:01.27 (2021), 4:01.30 (2022), 4:01.37 (2021), 4:01.45 (2016), 4:01.50 (2019), 4:01.59 (2022), 4:01.64 (2021), 4:01.68 (2019), 4:01.73 (2015), 4:01.81 (2015), 4:01.84 (2019), 4:01.95 (2015), 4:01.96 (2017), 4:01.98 (2016), 4:02.08 (2018), 4:02.15 (2016), 4:02.21 (2016, 2018), 4:02.38 (2021), 4:02.40 (2019), 4:02.41 (2017), 4:02.44 (2019), 4:02.51 (2022), 4:02.57 (2018), 4:02.59 (2017), 4:02.62 (2016), 4:02.67 (2015, 2015), 4:02.69 (2018), 4:02.71 (2019, 2022), 4:02.80 (2022), 4:02.87 (2019), 4:03.05 (2013, 2015), 4:03.07 (2021), 4:03.09 (2014, 2014), 4:03.21 (2022).
Summer McIntosh also swam 3:59.39 (2022), 3:59.79 (2022), 4:01.59 (2022), 4:02.42 (2021), 4:02.72 (2021), 4:03.19 (2022).
Federica Pellegrini also swam 4:00.41 (2009), 4:01.53 (2008), 4:01.96 (2009), 4:01.97 (2011), 4:02.19 (2008), 4:03.12 (2010).
Joanne Jackson swam 4:00.66 (2009).
Rebecca Adlington also swam 4:00.89 (2009), 4:02.24 (2008), 4:02.35 (2012), 4:02.80 (2008), 4:02.84 (2011), 4:03.01 (2012).
Leah Smith also swam 4:01.29 (2019), 4:01.54 (2017), 4:01.92 (2016), 4:02.00 (2017), 4:02.08 (2022), 4:02.21 (2018), 4:03.14 (2016), 4:03.15 (2022).
Camille Muffat also swam 4:01.45 (2012), 4:02.64 (2013), 4:02.84 (2013), 4:02.97 (2012), 4:03.21 (2012).
Li Bingjie also swam 4:01.57 (2021), 4:01.75 (2017), 4:02.36 (2021), 4:02.52 (2017).
Lani Pallister also swam 4:02.21 (2022).
Erika Fairweather also swam 4:02.28 (2021).
Katie Hoff also swam 4:02.32 (2008).
Allison Schmitt also swam 4:02.51 (2009), 4:02.80 (2009), 4:02.84 (2012).
Laure Manaudou also swam 4:02.61 (2007), 4:03.03 (2006).
Jazmin Carlin also swam 4:02.83 (2016).
Wang Jianjiahe also swam 4:03.18 (2018).

Women short course
Correct as of December 2022

Notes
Below is a list of other times equal or superior to 3:58.15:
Katie Ledecky also swam 3:54.04 (2022), 3:54.06 (2019).
Wang Jianjiahe also swam 3:54.56 (2018), 3:54.63 (2018).
Ariarne Titmus also swam 3:54.58 (2020), 3:56.21 (2019).
Camille Muffat also swam 3:54.93 (2012), 3:57.48 (2008).
Lauren Boyle also swam 3:55.31 (2013), 3:57.68 (2013).
Mireia Belmonte also swam 3:55.36 (2014), 3:55.76 (2014), 3:56.14 (2013), 3:57.65 (2013), 3:57.79 (2017).
Li Bingjie also swam 3:55.83 (2022), 3:57.99 (2018).
Lani Pallister also swam 3:56.74 (2022).
Laure Manaudou also swam 3:56.79 (2005), 3:57.43 (2007).
Siobhan Haughey also swam 3:57.06 (2021), 3:58.12 (2021).
Coralie Balmy also swam 3:57.75 (2009).
Summer McIntosh also swam 3:57.75 (2021), 3:57.87 (2021).
Federica Pellegrini also swam 3:57.80 (2017).
Holly Hibbott also swam 3:57.96 (2019).

References

External links
 International Olympic Committee
 Sports Records 
 New Zealand Short Course Open Records

Freestyle 0400 metres
World record progression 0400 metres freestyle